RGBI could refer to:

 Rio Grande Bible Institute
 RGBI interface — Red, Green, Blue, Intensity; a color format, most commonly used in an RGBI cathode ray tube monitor interface